Helena Sampaio (born 9 October 1973 in Pedreira) is a Portuguese runner, who specialized in cross-country running.

Achievements

Personal bests
10,000 metres - 31:43.22 min (1999)
Half marathon - 1:10:15 hrs (2000)
Marathon - 2:28:06 hrs (2003)

External links

The World Cross Country Championships 1973-2005

1973 births
Living people
Portuguese female long-distance runners
Athletes (track and field) at the 2004 Summer Olympics
Olympic athletes of Portugal
Portuguese female marathon runners